The 2021 ISA World Surfing Games took place across the La Bocana and El Sunzal waves at Surf City in El Salvador, from 29 May to 6 June 2021. The event was originally scheduled to be held from 9 to 17 May 2020, but was postponed due to the COVID-19 pandemic. The event was organised by the International Surfing Association (ISA).

Medal summary

Medallists

Medal table

Participating nations

Russian Surfing Federation

Results

Olympic qualification

The event contributed towards qualification for the 2020 Olympics in Tokyo, where surfing will make its debut as an Olympic sport. The top five eligible men and top seven eligible women who had not already qualified via the 2019 World Surf League qualified for the Olympics, subject to a maximum of two surfers per National Olympic Committee in each of the men's and women's events.

Men's
 
 
 
 
 

Women's

References

External links
International Surfing Association

ISA World Surfing Games
ISA World Surfing Games
ISA World Surfing Games
ISA World Surfing Games
ISA World Surfing Games
ISA World Surfing Games
International sports competitions hosted by El Salvador
ISA World Surfing Games
ISA World Surfing Games